Bauhinia seminarioi is a species of plant in the family Fabaceae. It is found only in Ecuador. Its natural habitat is subtropical or tropical dry forests.

References

seminarioi
Endemic flora of Ecuador
Critically endangered flora of South America
Taxonomy articles created by Polbot